Marathon Independent School District is a school district based in Marathon, a census-designated place in Brewster County, Texas, United States.

Marathon ISD serves Marathon and a few surrounding areas of northeastern Brewster County. The district has one K-12 school, with two buildings: a secondary school building and an elementary school building.

It is classified as a 1A school by the UIL. Typically due to its isolation, Marathon generally has the lowest high school enrollment in the state. Marathon's secondary division serves grades 7-12. In 2015, the school was rated "Met Standard" by the Texas Education Agency.

History
As of 2007, the Texas State Energy Conservation Office awards Marathon ISD money due to the colonias served by the district.

In 2009, the school district was rated "recognized" by the Texas Education Agency.

Athletics
The Marathon Mustangs compete in the following sports - 

Basketball
Cross Country
Golf
Tennis
Track and Field

State titles
Football – 
1974(6M), 1976(6M) 
(Both teams were undefeated).

State Finalist  
Football – 
1973(6M), 1975(6M), 1977(6M)

Marathon was also undefeated in 1969 and 1970.

See also
Other high schools in Brewster County:
 Alpine High School
 Big Bend High School

References

External links

Marathon ISD website

 - Has boundary of the district - 2010 Map

School districts in Brewster County, Texas
Public K-12 schools in Texas